Anna Hunt Marsh (c. 1770 – 1834) left $10,000 in her will to establish the Vermont Asylum of the Insane (now the Brattleboro Retreat) in 1834.

Life and career
Marsh was born in Hinsdale, New Hampshire to Jonathan Hunt. She married Perley Marsh in 1793.

She is responsible for the creation of the Brattleboro Retreat, originally known as the Vermont Asylum for the Insane. She was the first woman credited with starting a hospital for the mentally ill. She was responsible for selecting the trustees before her death. A bad healing experience leading to the death of a member of her family has been suggested as an impetus to her idea of creating a humane care option. Her vision was a facility patterned on a Quaker concept called moral treatment. Marsh otherwise did not have much to do with Brattleboro.

Upon her death, her will instructed heirs to build a mental hospital in Brattleboro. This was founded in 1834 with her $10,000 bequest.

Legacy
The Retreat grew in popularity and had success treating people with a combination of fresh air, exercise, good food, and other treatments for the "insane". Large porches on the buildings allowed patients to sit and read, relax, and recover. As of 2015, the Brattleboro Retreat is still in operation serving a wide variety of mental conditions on a 1000-acre (4 km²) campus.

References

External links
Description of Retreat Buildings
Retreat Healthcare (formerly Brattleboro Retreat)

1834 deaths
People from Brattleboro, Vermont
People from Hinsdale, New Hampshire
Year of birth uncertain